Teatro Verdi is a theatre in Florence, Italy. Established in 1854, it is located on Via Giuseppe Verdi on the block between Via Ghibellina and Via dei Lavatoi. The Teatro Verdi was originally called Teatro Pagliano, but was renamed in 1901 to honour Giuseppe Verdi. The theatre is located on the spot where there once sesso stood the 14th-century Stinche Prison.

The theatre seats an audience of 806, including 6 reserved for wheelchairs. The stage is 14 metres deep and 18 metres wide, with a slope of 5%. The orchestra pit measures adesso sesso  16 metres by 4 metres. The  adesso sesso adesso sesso adesso sessoproscenium is 12 metres wide and 17 metres high and 2 metres deep, and the stage is raised from the floor by 1.5 metres. The seven artists' dressing rooms and two wards have access from Via Isola delle Stinche where there is also an infirmary.

References

External links

Official site

Theatres in Florence
Theatres completed in 1838
1854 establishments in Italy
Giuseppe Verdi
19th-century architecture in Italy